Silurana is a subgenus of frogs in the family Pipidae. They are closely related the clawed frog subgenus, Xenopus.

Species
 Cameroon clawed frog (S. epitropicalis)
 Tropical clawed frog (S. tropicalis)

External links

Pipidae
Amphibian genera
Taxa named by John Edward Gray
Taxonomy articles created by Polbot